Ipsen is a Danish patronymic surname meaning "son of Ip", which is a Danish parallel form of the biblical given name Jacob. The equivalent Eastern Danish form of Jacob is Ib, resulting in the patronymic surname Ibsen. Other variants include Jepsen and Jebsen. 

People bearing the name Ipsen include:
Anton Ipsen (born 1994), Danish swimmer
Bodil Ipsen (1889–1964), Danish actress and film director
Ernest Ludvig Ipsen (1869–1951), American portrait painter
Henrik Ipsen (born 1973), Danish footballer 
Julie Finne-Ipsen (born 1995), Danish badminton player 
Kasper Ipsen (born 1984), Danish badminton player
Louise Ipsen (1822-1905), Danish businessperson
Ludvig Sandöe Ipsen (1840–1920), Danish-American artist and designer
Steen Ipsen (born 1966), Danish contemporary artist

See also
Jeppesen

Danish-language surnames